Thame Museum is a local museum located in the High Street of the town of Thame in Oxfordshire, England.

The museum has a number of nationally important Tudor wall paintings, housed in their own room. A Community Room is used for temporary exhibitions and other activities.

See also
 List of museums in Oxfordshire
 Museum of Oxford

References

External links
 Thame Museum website

Museums with year of establishment missing
Local museums in Oxfordshire
Thame